American Awesome Alliance is an American post-hardcore band from Orlando, Florida. Formed in 2012 by Brannon Centeno and Christopher Lee, the group has released six singles and one cover to date. Their cover of Let It Go from Disney's Frozen garnered the band a lot of attention and was met with mostly positive reception from critics. The group has been featured by popular websites such as Alternative Press, MetalSucks, Stuff You Will Hate, and The New Fury.
American Awesome Alliance is currently working on their highly anticipated full-length album and are pioneering new, uncharted grounds in the post-hardcore scene.

History

Formation and Debut Single (2012) 

American Awesome Alliance was founded spring of 2012 by Brannon Centeno and Christopher Lee after the breakup of a previous band. Initially envisioned as a joke band, it quickly became apparent that the fledgling duo had greater aspirations for the project. In fall of 2012, they journeyed to Earthsound Studio in Valdosta, Georgia to record their first single "Jeremiah’s Big Wish" with audio engineer Lee Dyess (From First To Last, I Set My Friends On Fire, Against Me!, Mayday Parade). Releasing the single that same season, they garnered a small, but dedicated following.

Addition of New Members and Warped Tour, FL (2013/2014) 

Jeremy Mullins was then brought on board to play bass in winter of 2013. Summer of 2013, they released two more singles "Stop Right There, Criminal Scum" and "Ovary Acting" recorded by Alan Reitman (Search the City, Shout London, Cold For June) at Stallion Studios. These two singles greatly deviated from the post-hardcore sound of their earlier material, taking a more experimental approach. The following year they competed in the Ernie Ball Battle of the Bands to win a spot on the St. Petersburg, Florida date of Warped Tour 2014. To support this venture, they released a cover of Disney’s "Let It Go" featuring singer Ashly Nicole and guitarist Nick Reitman, a limitedly available demo of a new song "Magnum Cum Latte", and a series of YouTube videos. Also during this time, Alan Reitman became their guitarist. Their efforts were rewarded when they won the chance to play the St. Petersburg date of Warped Tour 2014.

AAA Collab With I Set My Friends On Fire (2015) 

On March 6, 2015, American Awesome Alliance unveiled their music video for "Magnum Cum Latte' via Alternative Press Magazine. The video featured Matt Mehana from I Set My Friends On Fire. In September 2015, Alan left the band due to creative differences. American Awesome Alliance began recording their debut album titled "The Mass Extinction of Everything That Was and What Ever Will Be", which was slated for a release date of May 29, 2016.

The Mass Extinction of What Was and What Ever Will Be (2016) 
In early January 2016, Jeremiah Hagan joined the band as clean vocalist. In March, Justin Andrews became the band's latest addition on guitar. Despite the album being delayed on May 29, 2016, the group released "Jack Off", the second single of "The Mass Extinction of What Was and What Ever Will Be. On July 10th, the band parted ways with clean vocalist, Jeremiah Hagan.

Band members
Current members
Brannon Centeno - lead vocals (2012-2016, 2016-present), sequencer, programming (2012-present), guitar (2012-2013, 2015-2016)
Christopher Lee - drums, percussion (2012–present)
Jeremy Mullins - bass (2013–present)
Justin Andrews - guitar (2016–present)
Past members
Alan Reitman -  guitar, backing vocals, programming (2014–2015)
Jeremiah Hagan - clean vocals (2016)

Timeline

Discography
EPs

Singles

References

Musical groups established in 2012
Electronicore musical groups
Musical groups from Orlando, Florida
2012 establishments in Florida